This is a list of castles and chateaux located in the Zlín Region of the Czech Republic.

A
 Arnoltovice Castle

B

 Bánov Castle
 Bílovice Chateau
 Branky Chateau
 Brumov Castle
 Buchlov Castle
 Buchlovice Chateau
 Bystřice pod Hostýnem Chateau

C
 Cetechovice Chateau
 Chlum Castle, Bílavsko
 Choryně Chateau
 Chropyně Chateau
 Cimburk u Koryčan Castle

D
 Dřínov Chateau

E
 Engelsberk Castle

H
 Holešov Chateau
 Hoštice Chateau
 Hošťálková Chateau
 Hovězí Chateau
 Hradiště Castle, Loučka
 Hrádek u Přílep Castle
 Hulín Castle

K
 Kasařov Castle
 Kelč Chateau
 Klenov Castle
 Krásno nad Bečvou Chateau
 Kroměříž Archbishop's Palace
 Křídlo Castle
 Kurovice Castle
 Kvasice Chateau

L
 Lešná Chateau
 Litenčice Chateau
 Loučka Chateau
 Luhačovice Chateau
 Lukov Castle

M
 Malenovice Castle
 Morkovice Chateau

N
 Napajedla Chateau
 Nezdenice Chateau
 Nový Světlov Chateau
 Nový Šaumburk Castle

O
 Obřany Castle

P
 Pačlavice Chateau
 Přílepy Chateau
 Pulčín Castle

R
 Rožnov Castle
 Rýsov Castle

S
 Šaumburk Castle
 Skalný Castle
 Slavičín Chateau
 Starý Světlov Castle
 Střílky Castle
 Střílky Chateau

U
 Uherský Brod Castle
 Uherský Brod Chateau

V
 Valašské Meziříčí Chateau
 Velký Ořechov Chateau
 Věžky Chateau
 Vizovice Chateau
 Vsetín Chateau

Z
 Zdislavice Chateau
 Zlín Chateau
 Zuvačov Castle
 Žeranovice Castle
 Žeranovice Chateau

See also
 List of castles in the Czech Republic
 List of castles in Europe
 List of castles

External links 
 Castles, Chateaux, and Ruins 
 Czech Republic - Manors, Castles, Historical Towns
 Hrady.cz 

 
Zlin